Fort Al-Mirani is a fort located in the harbor of the city of Old Muscat, Oman. The fort existed prior to the Portuguese invasion and was later rebuilt by the Portuguese in 1587. The fort became the first to use cannons in Oman.

History

In the 1552 Capture of Muscat, an Ottoman force consisted in 4 galleons, 25 galleys, and 850 troops attacked the city of Muscat. They captured the city and its fort. The recently built Fort Al-Mirani was besieged for 18 days with one piece of Ottoman artillery brought on top of a ridge. The fort was captured and its fortifications destroyed.

References

External links
 

Al Mirani
Old Muscat
Portuguese colonial architecture in Oman